Carlos Gurpegui Nausia (alternate spelling Gurpegi; born 19 August 1980) is a Spanish football manager and former player who played as a central defender or defensive midfielder. He is the manager of CD Basconia.

He spent his entire professional career with Athletic Bilbao, which was marred by a two-year ban due to a nandrolone positive test. Over 14 La Liga seasons, he appeared in 393 matches in all competitions and scored 22 goals.

Club career
Born in Pamplona and raised in the village of Andosilla, Navarre, Gurpegui was a product of Athletic Bilbao's Lezama youth academy, and made his first-team – and La Liga – debut on 31 March 2002 in a 5–2 away defeat against Villarreal CF, going on to establish himself as the first-choice holding midfielder in the following years with 121 games in four seasons. On 17 January 2004, he scored a late equaliser against FC Barcelona in a 1–1 draw at the Camp Nou.

Gurpegui was banned for two years on 3 November 2003, for testing positive for nandrolone in a 1 September 2002 game against Real Sociedad (4–2 away defeat, scoring both goals) the previous season. The ban was initially suspended after repeated appeals, with the player claiming that his body produced nandrolone naturally, but the appeals were in vain and he eventually was forced to serve his sentence, which ran until 23 April 2008; Athletic Bilbao, however, neither released the player nor took his number from the official squad, and he returned to action in a 3–0 away loss to Real Madrid four days later.

In the 2008–09 campaign, Gurpegui was used mostly as a backup due to the emergence of youngster Javi Martínez, but regained his starting position in the following years, precisely alongside Martínez. On 28 November 2010, he headed home in the last minute against hometown club CA Osasuna, in a 1–0 home win.

Gurpegui was again an important player in 2011–12 under new coach Marcelo Bielsa. On 23 October 2011, having replaced Andoni Iraola at half-time in an eventual 1–1 draw at Valencia CF, he also had to leave the pitch early into the second half, with a torn anterior cruciate ligament which ended his season.

After Martínez left in summer 2012 to join FC Bayern Munich, Gurpegui was chosen by Bielsa as the next player to be converted from defensive midfielder to central defender. After playing a big role in their qualification for the tournament through finishing fourth domestically in 2013–14, partnering the much younger Aymeric Laporte, he featured in defence in six matches in the subsequent edition of the UEFA Champions League.  

The team reached three finals of the Copa del Rey in Gurpegui's time at the San Mamés Stadium, losing them all to Barcelona – he was an unused substitute on every occasion. He did play in both legs of the 2015 Supercopa de España against the same opponents, lifting the trophy as captain.

On 11 May 2016, by now a fringe player, 35-year-old Gurpegui announced he would retire from the game at the end of the season.

International career
Gurpegui played six matches (one goal) for the unofficial Basque selection. He also featured for the equivalent Navarrese team. 

Gurpegui had already retired from club football when he appeared in his last friendly for the Basque Country on 27 May 2016, a draw and win on penalties over Corsica.

Coaching career
On retiring from playing, Gurpegui was appointed to a coaching role at Athletic Bilbao working under Ernesto Valverde. However, when the latter moved to Barcelona in the 2017 off-season he did not take the former with him, nor was there any place in the new Athletic coaching structure under José Ángel Ziganda; instead, Gurpegui was appointed as an ambassador for the club. 

In December 2021, having rejoined the club's coaching network, Gurpegui was appointed head coach of the farm team, CD Basconia, with previous incumbent Patxi Salinas having moved up to the reserves.

Personal life
Gurpegui's older brother, Pedro María, was also a footballer who played as a forward. He had a spell in the reserve side of Osasuna, coming up against his younger sibling in a league fixture in the semi-professional Segunda División B in 2000.

Pedro's career stalled after a serious knee injury, and he never played above that level.

Career statistics

Managerial statistics

Honours
Athletic Bilbao
Supercopa de España: 2015; Runner-up 2009
Copa del Rey runner-up: 2008–09, 2011–12, 2014–15

See also
List of sportspeople sanctioned for doping offences

References

External links

1980 births
Living people
Spanish footballers
Footballers from Pamplona
Association football defenders
Association football midfielders
Association football utility players
La Liga players
Segunda División B players
Tercera División players
CD Izarra footballers
CD Basconia footballers
Bilbao Athletic footballers
Athletic Bilbao footballers
Basque Country international footballers
Spanish football managers
Tercera Federación managers
CD Basconia managers
Doping cases in association football
Spanish sportspeople in doping cases
Athletic Bilbao non-playing staff